Twilight 22 was an American electro band led by Gordon Bahary, but also featuring lead singer and co-songwriter Joseph Saulter.

"Electric Kingdom"
The duo released only one single, "Electric Kingdom", released on their 1984 debut album Twilight 22 by Vanguard Records. The song peaked at #7 on US R&B Charts.

Chart performance

Discography

Albums
Twilight 22 (Vanguard, 1984)

References

American electronic music groups
American musical duos
Electronic music duos
Electronic music groups from California